The Edwin W. Marsh House is (or was) a historic house at 17 Marsh Street in Quincy, Massachusetts.  The -story five-bay wood-frame house was built c. 1851, and had a rear ell. The Cape style cottage had vernacular Greek Revival styling, including corner pilasters.  It had a bracketed entry portico that was probably added during the Italianate period (1860s-70s).

The house was listed on the National Register of Historic Places in 1989.  The lot is now occupied by a multiunit townhouse (pictured).

See also
National Register of Historic Places listings in Quincy, Massachusetts

References

Houses completed in 1851
Houses in Quincy, Massachusetts
National Register of Historic Places in Quincy, Massachusetts
1851 establishments in Massachusetts
Houses on the National Register of Historic Places in Norfolk County, Massachusetts
Greek Revival architecture in Massachusetts